Francis S. Bowling (1916 – July 13, 1997) was a justice of the Supreme Court of Mississippi from 1977 to 1984.

Raised in Newton, Mississippi, Bowling received his undergraduate degree from the University of Mississippi and a law degree from the University of Mississippi School of Law.

He served in the U.S. Army during World War II in the Judge Advocate General department. He opened his law practice in Jackson in 1944.

Bowling served as chairman of the Mississippi Game and Fish Commission during Gov. Bill Waller's tenure. Waller also appointed him circuit judge of the 7th Judicial District, and in 1977 he was appointed to the Mississippi Supreme Court by Gov. Cliff Finch where he served until 1985.

Judicial service
After Gillespie resigned, on August 1, 1977, Circuit Judge Francis Bowling of Jackson was appointed by Governor Finch. Bowling was unopposed in the election to fill the remaining two years of the term, and he ran unopposed for reelection to a full term in 1978. He  resigned effective December 31, 1984.

Death
Bowling died at his home of a self-inflicted gunshot wound at the age of 80.

References

1916 births
1997 deaths
20th-century American judges
People from Newton, Mississippi
University of Mississippi School of Law alumni
United States Army Judge Advocate General's Corps
United States Army personnel of World War II
Lawyers from Jackson, Mississippi
Justices of the Mississippi Supreme Court
Suicides by firearm in Mississippi